El hijo de Hernández is an American-made 2013 Spanish feature-length drama film directed by Lorenzo M. Ponce de León and is based on the novel El hijo de Hernández by Frédéric Conrod, and starring Juan Penalva, Antonio Sarrió, Roxanne Rodríguez, Guglia Rivera, and Kathleen Zamon. It was created alongside the author of the book and shot in Madrid and Castilla-La Mancha, Spain, when the actual setting of the book and film is undisclosed. The narrative is set almost entirely in the desert. Ponce de León describes the film as "The precise balance between theatre and cinema giving viewers both a cinematic experience and the sensations of sitting in a theatre watching actors on a stage."

Cast
 Juan Penalva as Miguel
 Antonio Sarrió as Don Álvaro
 Roxanne Rodríguez as Marcela / Polica del Desierto 
 Guglia Rivera as Linda
 Kathleen Zamon as Mujer Alemana / Difunta Correa

Production
Produced through MADRID_CREAcción y Teatro Lírico de Las Muñecas in Madrid, El hijo de Hernández was financed through a scholarship awarded by Florida Atlantic University. Filming started on 14 June 2012 in Madrid. The film's entire shooting lasted approximately three weeks and included shooting a music video based on the song El hijo de Hernández  by El Cuarteto de Nos.

Release
The film was released to a private audience on 12 April 2013 in Living Room Theaters in Boca Raton, Florida.

References

External links
 
 Director's Website
 Teatro Lírico de Las Muñecas
 

2013 films
Spanish drama films
2010s Spanish-language films
Films shot in Madrid
Films shot in Spain
2013 drama films